Mihi  is a rural community in Rotorua Lakes within the Waikato region of New Zealand's North Island. It is located on the northern banks of the Waikato River, near the mouth of the Waiotapu Stream, and just off State Highway 5.

Education

References

Rotorua Lakes District
Populated places in Waikato
Populated places on the Waikato River